Horn Island is the name of:
 Hornos Island, in Antártica Chilena Province of Magallanes y Antártica Chilena Region, Chile
 Horn Island (Mississippi), USA

 Horn Island, Queensland, Australia
 Hoorn Islands, a group of two islands, Futuna and Alofi, in the Pacific Ocean, now part of Wallis and Futuna